The Thirty-Fifth Wisconsin Legislature convened from  to  in regular session.

Senators representing even-numbered districts were newly elected for this session and were serving the first year of a two-year term. Assembly members were elected to a one-year term. Assembly members and even-numbered senators were elected in the general election of November 8, 1881. Senators representing odd-numbered districts were serving the second year of their two-year term, having been elected in the general election held on November 2, 1880.

Major events
 January 2, 1882: Inauguration of Jeremiah McLain Rusk as the 15th Governor of Wisconsin.
 May 6, 1882: U.S. President Chester A. Arthur signed the Chinese Exclusion Act, prohibiting immigration from China.
 August 3, 1882: U.S. President Chester A. Arthur signed the Immigration Act of 1882, which created the first U.S. bureaucracy for determining which immigrants would be allowed to settle in the United States.
 November 7, 1882: At the state's general election, Wisconsin voters approved two amendments to the Constitution of Wisconsin.
 The first amendment removed the word "white" from the section of the constitution which defined eligible voters in the state.  
 The second amendment abolished special elections for county officers and instead gave the Governor power to appoint acting officers when a vacancy occurs, except for the clerks of the circuit court, where appointment power was granted to the circuit court judge. The amendment also standardized all county officer terms, with elections occurring in even-numbered years.

Major legislation
 March 28, 1882: An Act to apportion the state into senate and assembly districts, 1882 Act 242.  Redistricted the state legislature following the 1880 United States census.
 March 28, 1882: An Act to apportion the state into congressional districts, 1882 Act 244.  Redrew Wisconsin's congressional districts for their new delegation, expanding to 8 seats from 6, following the 1880 United States census.
 Joint Resolution ratifying amendments to section 4 of article VI, section 12 of article VII, and section 1 of article XIII of the constitution of the State of Wisconsin, so as to provide for biennial general elections, 1882 Joint Resolution 3. Second legislative approval of the proposed amendment to the Wisconsin Constitution to standardize county officer terms, and obviate special elections for county officers.  The amendment was ratified by voters in the November 1882 general election.
 Joint Resolution in relation to suffrage, 1882 Joint Resolution 5. Second legislative approval of the proposed amendment to the Wisconsin Constitution to strike the word "white" from the section defining eligible voters.  The amendment was ratified by voters in the November 1882 general election.

Party summary

Senate summary

Assembly summary

Sessions

 1st Regular session: January 11, 1882March 31, 1882

Leaders

Senate leadership
 President of the Senate: Sam S. Fifield (R)
 President pro tempore: George B. Burrows (R)

Assembly leadership
 Speaker of the Assembly: Franklin L. Gilson (R)

Members

Members of the Senate
Members of the Senate for the Thirty-Fifth Wisconsin Legislature:

Members of the Assembly
Members of the Assembly for the Thirty-Fifth Wisconsin Legislature:

Employees

Senate employees
 Chief Clerk: Charles E. Bross
 Assistant Clerk: Chauncey H. Cooke
 Bookkeeper: Oliver Munson
 Engrossing Clerk: H. R. Rawson
 Enrolling Clerk: J. W. Bintliff
 Transcribing Clerk: Fred J. Turner
 Proofreader: Frank A. Flower
 Clerk for the Judiciary Committee: Charles B. Miller
 Clerk for the Committee on Enrolled Bills: J. J. Crawford
 Document Clerk: Frank Hutson
 Sergeant-at-Arms: A. T. Glaze
 Assistant Sergeant-at-Arms: George S. Read
 Postmaster: Curtis M. Treat
 Assistant Postmaster: Ole Olsen
 Gallery Attendant: Claus Johnson
 Doorkeepers: 
 G. W. Churchill
 John C. Friswold
 Joseph A. Walker
 H. C. Graffam
 Porter: O. L. Wright
 Night Watch: George F. Witter Jr.
 Janitor: Ole Stephenson
 President's Messenger: Ben S. Smith
 Chief Clerk's Messenger: William P. Hyland
 Messengers: 
 John Bohn
 Adolph Roeder
 Samuel A. Wilder
 Charles G. Moll
 Will A. Blessing
 Forest McKay
 Emile Fargeot

Assembly employees
 Chief Clerk: Edwin Coe
 1st Assistant Clerk: John W. DeGroff
 2nd Assistant Clerk: T. W. Golden
 Bookkeeper: J. T. Huntington
 Engrossing Clerk: M. Sellers
 Enrolling Clerk: L. J. Burlingame
 Transcribing Clerk: A. C. Morse
 Proofreader: C. E. Parish
 Sergeant-at-Arms: David E. Welch
 Assistant Sergeant-at-Arms: G. L. Miller
 Postmaster: F. A. Ames
 Assistant Postmaster: W. A. Meiklejohn
 Doorkeepers: 
 J. Granvogl
 Patrick Mead
 C. H. Russell
 Henry Fitzgerald
 Gallery Attendant: B. H. Barnson
 Night Watch: Christopher Jerde
 Wash Room Attendant: A. J. Barsantee
 Speaker's Messenger: L. M. Steiner
 Chief Clerk's Messenger: Thomas McGovern
 Messengers:
 Thomas Wilkinson
 Carl Lawrence
 R. C. Odell
 George Ransom
 J. S. Sturtevant
 Wener Presentin
 Charles Smith
 D. C. Owen
 Fred Buckley

References

External links
 1882: Related Documents from Wisconsin Legislature

1882 in Wisconsin
Wisconsin
Wisconsin legislative sessions